Cesare Alejandro Sánchez Ruíz (born 29 June 1949) is a Mexican hurdler. He competed in the men's 400 metres hurdles at the 1968 Summer Olympics.

References

1949 births
Living people
Athletes (track and field) at the 1968 Summer Olympics
Mexican male hurdlers
Olympic athletes of Mexico
Athletes (track and field) at the 1967 Pan American Games
Pan American Games competitors for Mexico
Place of birth missing (living people)
Central American and Caribbean Games medalists in athletics